Salisbury Plantation is a  historic house located at Westover, Somerset County, Maryland. It has two principal sections: a 19th-century, two-story plus attic clapboard section whose roof ridge runs east to west, and a first-quarter-18th-century -story brick section with its ridge running north to south.

It was listed on the National Register of Historic Places in 1975.

References

External links
, including undated photo, at Maryland Historical Trust

Houses in Somerset County, Maryland
Houses on the National Register of Historic Places in Maryland
Houses completed in 1725
Plantation houses in Maryland
1725 establishments in Maryland
National Register of Historic Places in Somerset County, Maryland